The Columbia 33 Caribbean is an American  sailboat that was designed by Wirth Munroe as deep water cruiser and first built in 1963.

The Columbia 33 Caribbean is a development of the Arco 33, which was built by Crystaliner, who completed 15 examples in 1959, before selling the molds to Columbia Yachts.

The Columbia 33 Caribbean design was developed into the Columbia 34 in 1966 with the addition of a new deck adapted from the Columbia 40 design.

Production
The Columbia 33 Caribbean design was built by Columbia Yachts, who built 61 examples between 1963 and 1965, but it is now out of production.

Design
The Columbia 33 Caribbean is a recreational keelboat, built predominantly of fiberglass, with wood trim. It has a masthead sloop rig, a spooned raked stem, a raised counter transom, a keel-mounted rudder controlled by a tiller and a fixed long keel with a retractable centerboard. It displaces  and carries  of ballast.

The boat is fitted with a Universal Atomic 4  gasoline engine for docking and maneuvering.

See also
List of sailing boat types

Related development
Columbia 34

Similar sailboats
Abbott 33
C&C 33
CS 33
Endeavour 33
Hunter 33
Hunter 33.5
Mirage 33
Nonsuch 33
Tanzer 10
Viking 33
Watkins 33

References

Keelboats
1960s sailboat type designs
Sailing yachts
Sailboat type designs by Wirth Munroe
Sailboat types built by Columbia Yachts